Elaine Kim may refer to:
 Elaine H. Kim (born 1942), Korean-American writer and professor of Asian American Studies
 Elaine Kim (fashion designer) (born 1962), Korean American fashion designer